Hans Christian Thulin (born 11 November 1977 in Malmö) is a Swedish actor. He studied at Malmö Theatre Academy and at Fridhems folkhögskola. He hosted the 2005 "Sommarlovsmorgon" Sommarlov 05 together with Björn Johansson Boklund and Ayla Kabaca.

Selected filmography
2003 – The Man Who Smiled
2006 – Emblas hemlighet (TV)
2009 – Flickan som lekte med elden

References

External links

Living people
Actors from Malmö
1977 births
Swedish male actors